Naomi Osaka defeated Jennifer Brady in the final, 6–4, 6–3 to win the women's singles tennis title at the 2021 Australian Open. It was her second Australian Open title and fourth major title overall. With the win, Osaka extended her winning streak to 21 matches, dating to the 2020 Cincinnati Open. She only lost one set during the tournament, to Garbiñe Muguruza in the fourth round; she also saved two match points in that match, making her the eighth woman to win the Australian Open after saving match points. Osaka became the third player in the Open Era, after Monica Seles and Roger Federer, to win their first four major finals.

Sofia Kenin was the defending champion, but lost to Kaia Kanepi in the second round.

Venus Williams became the first player aged 40 or more to win her first-round match since Martina Navratilova at the 2004 Wimbledon Championships.

Mayar Sherif became the first Egyptian woman to win a major main draw match. Hsieh Su-wei became the first Taiwanese woman to make a major singles quarterfinal. At 35 years of age, Hsieh also became the oldest player to make her quarterfinal debut.

Serena Williams equaled Chris Evert's all-time record of 54 major quarterfinals at this tournament; she then lost to Osaka in the semifinals. This was the seven-time champion's final appearance at the event. Williams announced her retirement from professional tennis the following year.

Seeds
Seeding per WTA rankings.

Draw

Finals

Top half

Section 1

Section 2

Section 3

Section 4

Bottom half

Section 5

Section 6

Section 7

Section 8

Other entry information

Wild cards

Protected ranking

Qualifiers

Lucky losers

Potential lucky losers

Withdrawals

 – not included on entry list& – withdrew from entry list

Championship match statistics

See also
2021 Australian Open – Day-by-day summaries
2021 WTA Tour
International Tennis Federation

Explanatory notes

References

External links
Draw information

Women's Singles
2021
2021 in Australian women's sport
2021 WTA Tour
2021 in women's tennis